The West Midlands Volleyball Association (WMVA) is the regional organisation responsible for organising volleyball in the West Midlands area of England.

Structure 

The WMVA runs 3 men's divisions and 2 ladies divisions.  It also runs men's and ladies cup and shield competitions during the season, which culminate in a finals day where all 4 competition finals are played.  The league season generally runs from mid September to the end of April, with finals day usually scheduled in May.

Each division is made up of 8 teams, however the lowest division of the men's and ladies competitions can have slightly more or fewer teams, depending on the number of team entrants for that season.  The top two teams in each division are promoted to the next division up, and the bottom two teams of each division are relegated to the next division down (with the exception of the lowest divisions).

Governance 

The WMVA is run on a day-to-day basis by a committee which encompasses roles including chairman, secretary, competitions officer, referees administrator, coaching administrator, junior development officer and league managers for each division and cup competition.  A yearly AGM takes place in June where all member clubs are obliged to send a representative.

History 

Volleyball in the United Kingdom
Volleyball organizations
West Midlands (region)
Volleyball in England